The Galilee Hitch-Hiker is Richard Brautigan's second poetry publication. It was first published in 1958 by White Rabbit Press in a hand-sewn edition of 200, and was sold by a variety of means, including City Lights Bookstore and direct sales by Brautigan to those passing by on the street.
 In 1966 the book was re-released by The Cranium Press in a run of 700 with an additional 16 signed and numbered copies. Brautigan signed each of the 16 copies in blue pencil and drew a small picture of a fish.

The contents consist of one poem with nine separately titled sections.  It was reprinted, in its entirety, in The Pill Versus the Springhill Mine Disaster.

References

External links
Entry on Brautigan.net

1958 poetry books
Works by Richard Brautigan
American poetry books